Ghuni is a census town in the Rajarhat CD block in the  Bidhannagar subdivision of the North 24 Parganas district in the state of West Bengal, India.

Geography

Location                                                       

Demographics
According to the 2011 Census of India, Ghuni had a total population of 24,249, of which 12,618 (52%) were males and 11,631 (48%) were females. Population in the age range 0-6 years was 3,017. The total number of literate persons in  Ghuni was 17,165 (80.84% of the population over 6 years).

Infrastructure
According to the District Census Handbook, North Twenty Four Parganas,  2011, Ghuni covered an area of 3.8918 km2. It had 6 km roads, with open drains. The protected water-supply involved overhead tank, tube well/ bore well, hand pump. It had 4,500 domestic electric connections, 40 road light points. Among the medical facilities it had 3 medicine shops. Among the educational facilities, it had 7 primary schools, middle, secondary, senior secondary schools at Hatiara 4 km away. The nearest college was 14 km away at Kolkata. It had the branch office of 1 agricultural credit society.

Healthcare
Rekjoani Rural Hospital at Rekjuani with 30 beds functions as the main medical facility in Rajarhat CD block.

References

Cities and towns in North 24 Parganas district